Grossology may refer to:

 Grossology (books), a series of non-fictional children's books written by Sylvia Branzei
 Grossology (TV series), a Canadian animated TV series